IMRO is a four-letter acronym that may refer to the:
Internal Macedonian Revolutionary Organization
Irish Music Rights Organisation
IMRO – Bulgarian National Movement

See also
Imaro